Rankin County is a county located in the U.S. state of Mississippi. The western border of the county is formed by the Pearl River. As of the 2020 census, the population was 157,031, making it the fourth-most populous county in Mississippi. The county seat is Brandon. The county is named in honor of Christopher Rankin, a Mississippi Congressman who served from 1819 to 1826.

Rankin County is part of the Jackson Metropolitan Statistical Area.

Geography

Adjacent counties
 Madison County (north)
 Scott County (east)
 Smith County (southeast)
 Simpson County (south)
 Hinds County (west)

Demographics

2020 census

As of the 2020 United States census, there were 157,031 people, 57,011 households, and 39,676 families residing in the county.

2000 census
As of the census of 2000, there were 115,327 people, 42,089 households, and 31,145 families residing in the county.  The population density was 149 people per square mile (57/km2).  There were 45,070 housing units at an average density of 58 per square mile (22/km2).  The racial makeup of the county was 81.03% White, 17.12% Black or African American, 0.16% Native American, 0.66% Asian, 0.02% Pacific Islander, 0.41% from other races, and 0.60% from two or more races.  1.32% of the population were Hispanic or Latino of any race.

According to the census of 2000, the largest ancestry groups in Rankin County were English 52.8%, Scots-Irish 15%, African 17.12%, Irish 5.1% and Scottish 3.2%.

There were 42,089 households, out of which 36.70% had children under the age of 18 living with them, 58.10% were married couples living together, 12.20% had a female householder with no husband present, and 26.00% were non-families. 21.90% of all households were made up of individuals, and 6.20% had someone living alone who was 65 years of age or older.  The average household size was 2.62 and the average family size was 3.07.

In the county, the population was spread out, with 25.90% under the age of 18, 9.10% from 18 to 24, 32.40% from 25 to 44, 23.00% from 45 to 64, and 9.50% who were 65 years of age or older. The median age was 35 years. For every 100 females, there were 95.60 males. For every 100 females age 18 and over, there were 92.50 males.

The median income for a household in the county was $44,946, and the median income for a family was $51,707. Males had a median income of $36,097 versus $26,096 for females. The per capita income for the county was $20,412. About 7.30% of families and 9.50% of the population were below the poverty line, including 12.20% of those under age 18 and 11.70% of those age 65 or over.

Rankin County has the second highest per capita income in the state of Mississippi.

Transportation

Major highways
  Interstate 20
  U.S. Highway 80
  U.S. Highway 49
  Mississippi Highway 13
  Mississippi Highway 18
  Mississippi Highway 25
  Mississippi Highway 43
  Mississippi Highway 471
  Interstate 55

Airport
Jackson Evers International Airport is located in unincorporated Rankin County.

Government

The Mississippi Department of Corrections (MDOC) operates the Central Mississippi Correctional Facility (CMCF), located in unincorporated Rankin County. CMCF houses the state's female death row inmates. MDOC also operates the Brandon Probation and Parole Office in Brandon. In 2007 the Mississippi Highway Patrol opened a driver's license facility across the highway from the prison.

The Mississippi State Hospital of the Mississippi Department of Mental Health is in Whitfield in unincorporated Rankin County. It occupies the former Rankin Farm prison grounds. In 1935, the Mississippi State Insane Asylum moved from a complex of 19th-century buildings in northern Jackson, the capital, to its current location.

The Mississippi Department of Public Safety operates the Mississippi Law Enforcement Officers' Training Academy (MLEOTA) on a  property in Rankin County, near CMCF and the MSH,  from Jackson.

The Mississippi Department of Environmental Quality operates the Central Regional Office and the MDEQ Laboratory in unincorporated Rankin County.

Rankin County is one of the most conservative counties in the state, with Republican candidates normally receiving 70% or so of the popular vote.

Communities

Cities
 Brandon (county seat)
 Florence
 Flowood
 Jackson (mostly in Hinds County, also in Madison County)
 Pearl
 Richland

Towns
 Pelahatchie

Village
 Puckett

Census-designated places
 Cleary
 Robinhood

Other unincorporated communities

 Cross Roads
 Fannin
 Goshen Springs
 Greenfield
 Gulde
 Johns
 Langford
 Leesburg
 Piney Woods
 Pisgah
 Sand Hill
 Star
 Whitfield

Former communities
 Cato
 Comeby
 Crossgates Farm
 Dobson
 Lynwood
 Robinhood/Shady Lakes
 Value

Education
Pearl Public School District and Rankin County School District are the two school districts in the county.

See also

 National Register of Historic Places listings in Rankin County, Mississippi
 Anse, Mississippi

References

External links
 The Rankin Chamber of Commerce
 Rankin County Genealogy and Historical Page
 Rankin County Website

 
Mississippi counties
Jackson metropolitan area, Mississippi
1828 establishments in Mississippi
Populated places established in 1828